The Mark 36 torpedo was a submarine-launched Anti-surface ship torpedo designed by General Electric and the Naval Torpedo Station in 1946. Further development of the Mark 36 was discontinued due to the development of the Mark 42 torpedo.

See also
American 21 inch torpedo

References

Torpedoes
Torpedoes of the United States
Unmanned underwater vehicles